Réjean Ducharme (August 12, 1941 – August 21, 2017) was a Québécois novelist and playwright who resided in Montreal.  He was known for his reclusive personality and did not appear at any public functions since his first successful book was published in 1966.  A common theme of his early work was the rejection of the adult world by children.

 (Swallowed), Ducharme's first novel, was short-listed for the 1966 Prix Goncourt, even though the author was only 24 years old and unknown. That same year, the book won the 1966 Governor General's Award for Poetry or Drama (Poésie et théâtre). L'Avalée des avalés later won the 2005 French version of Canada Reads, where it was defended by actress Sophie Cadieux.

In the 1992 movie Léolo, the main character spends much of his time reading and thinking about L'Avalée des avalés.

In 2017, Ducharme died of natural causes at age 76 in Montreal.

In summer 2021, the city's Sud-Ouest borough renamed its library the Bibliothèque Réjean-Ducharme in his honour.

Bibliography
L'Avalée des avalés - 1966 (winner of the 1966 Governor General's Awards)
translated into English as The Swallower Swallowed by Barbara Bray
translated into English as Swallowed by Madeleine Stratford (Montreal: Véhicule Press, 2020).
 - 1967
translated into English as Miss Take by Will Browning
 - 1968
La fille de Christophe Colomb - 1969
translated into English as The Daughter of Christopher Columbus by Will Browning
 - 1973 winner of the 1973 Governor General's Award for Fiction)
translated in English as "Wild to Mild" by Robert Guy Scully
 - 1976
Good Riddance (Les Bons débarras) - 1980 (film screenplay)
Happy Memories (Les Beaux souvenirs) - 1982 (film screenplay)
Ha ha!... - 1982 (winner of the 1982 Governor General's Award for Drama)
Dévadé - 1990
Va savoir - 1994 (nominated for a Governor General's Award
translated into English as Go Figure by Will Browning
Gros mots - 1999

See also
 List of Canadian writers
 List of Quebec writers

References

External links

 Réjean Ducharme's entry in The Canadian Encyclopedia
  Fonds Réjean Ducharme (R11725) at Library and Archives Canada
  Collection Rosette Rohana (lettres de Réjean Ducharme), (R12366) at Library and Archives Canada. The collection consists of 14 letters by Réjean Ducharme sent to Rosette Rohana and to one of her friend.

1941 births
2017 deaths
French Quebecers
Canadian male novelists
20th-century Canadian novelists
21st-century Canadian novelists
20th-century Canadian dramatists and playwrights
21st-century Canadian dramatists and playwrights
Writers from Quebec
Governor General's Award-winning fiction writers
Best Screenplay Genie and Canadian Screen Award winners
Sculptors from Quebec
Prix Athanase-David winners
Governor General's Award-winning dramatists
Canadian novelists in French
Canadian dramatists and playwrights in French
20th-century Canadian sculptors
Canadian male screenwriters
Canadian male dramatists and playwrights
20th-century Canadian male writers
21st-century Canadian male writers
Canadian screenwriters in French